The Gyeongbuk Line is a railway line serving North Gyeongsang Province in South Korea. The line runs from Gimcheon on the Gyeongbu Line via Sangju, Jeomchon (junction with the Mungyeong Line), and Yecheon to Yeongju on the Jungang Line.

History 
Construction of the line was begun by the privately owned Chosen Industrial Railway; however, before the line was finished, that company merged with five others to create the Chosen Railway (Chōtetsu) in 1923, and it was the new company which completed the first section of the line, opening the Gimcheon–Sangju section on 1 October 1924, followed by the Sangju–Jeomchon section on 25 December. Chōtetsu then extended the line in several stages, first reaching Yecheon on 1 November 1928, then reaching Gyeongbuk Andong on 16 October 1931; however, the latter section was dismantled in 1944 to use the material elsewhere as Japan's military faced material shortages during the Pacific War. After the Liberation of Korea, the Chosen Railway was nationalised along with all other railways in the country.

Following the 1961 coup, the Supreme Council for National Reconstruction started South Korea's first five-year plan, which included a construction program to complete the railway network, to foster economic growth. Under the program, the Gyeongbuk Line was extended to Yeongju, to create a connection both with the Jungang Line and the Yeongdong Line, allowing the transport of coal from the latter.

Operation 
As of 2010, the line is served by both passenger and freight trains along its entire length, as is the Mungyeong branch. As of November 2010, the line is served by Mugunghwa cross-country trains from Busan and Dongdaegu, which travel in 2 hours 12 minutes from Gimcheon to Yeongju.

Route

See also 
 Korean National Railroad

References 

Transport in North Gyeongsang Province
Railway lines in South Korea
Railway lines opened in 1924